Kunda is a constituency of the Uttar Pradesh Legislative Assembly covering the city of Kunda in the Pratapgarh district of Uttar Pradesh, India.

Kunda (कुंडा / कुंडाहरनामगंज) is one of five assembly constituencies in the Kaushambi Lok Sabha constituency. Since 2008, this assembly constituency is numbered 246 amongst 403 constituencies.

Since 1993 this seat belongs to Jansatta Dal Loktantrik candidate Raghuraj Pratap Singh (Raja Bhaiya), who won in last Assembly election of 2022 Uttar Pradesh Legislative Elections by defeating Samajwadi Party candidate Gulshan Yadav by a margin of around 30,000 votes.

Members of Legislative Assembly
 1952: Three candidates elected from Kunda
 1957: Two candidates, both independent, elected from Kunda
 1962: Niyaz Hasan Khan (INC) 
 1967: Niyaz Hasan Khan (INC)
 1969: Jai Ram (SSP)
 1974: Niyaz Hasan Khan (NCO)
 1977: Shashi Prabha (JNP) 
 1980: Niyaz Hasan Khan (INC - I)
 1985: Niyaz Hasan Khan (INC)  
 1989: Niyaz Hasan Khan (INC)
 1991: Shiv Narayan Mishra (BJP)

Election results

2022 Vidhan Sabha elections

2017 Vidhan Sabha elections

2012 Vidhan Sabha elections

2007 Vidhan Sabha elections

2002 Vidhan Sabha elections

References

External links
 

Assembly constituencies of Uttar Pradesh
Pratapgarh district, Uttar Pradesh